In Greek mythology, Strophius (Ancient Greek: Στρόφιος means "slippery fellow, twister") was the name of the following personages:

 Strophius, son of Crisus, was a King of Phocis, husband of the sister of Agamemnon (whose name was either Anaxibia, Astyocheia or Cydragora) and, by her, father of Pylades and Astydameia. When Orestes was hiding from his murderous mother, Clytemnestra, Strophius hid him. During this time, Orestes and Pylades became great friends.
 Strophius, one of Pylades' sons with Electra, Orestes' sister. Pylades and Electra's other son was Medon.
 Strophius, father of the Trojan Scamandrius, who was killed by Menelaus.
Strophius, father of Phlogius, a companion of Dionysus in the Indian campaign.
Strophius, a man in the crew of Menelaus during his return from Troy.

Notes

References 

 Aeschylus, translated in two volumes. 2. Agamemnon by Herbert Weir Smyth, Ph.D. Cambridge, MA. Harvard University Press. 1926. Online version at the Perseus Digital Library. Greek text available from the same website.
 Apollodorus, The Library with an English Translation by Sir James George Frazer, F.B.A., F.R.S. in 2 Volumes, Cambridge, MA, Harvard University Press; London, William Heinemann Ltd. 1921. . Online version at the Perseus Digital Library. Greek text available from the same website.
Gaius Julius Hyginus, Fabulae from The Myths of Hyginus translated and edited by Mary Grant. University of Kansas Publications in Humanistic Studies. Online version at the Topos Text Project.
 Homer, The Iliad with an English Translation by A.T. Murray, Ph.D. in two volumes. Cambridge, MA., Harvard University Press; London, William Heinemann, Ltd. 1924. . Online version at the Perseus Digital Library.
 Homer, Homeri Opera in five volumes. Oxford, Oxford University Press. 1920. . Greek text available at the Perseus Digital Library.
 Nonnus of Panopolis, Dionysiaca translated by William Henry Denham Rouse (1863-1950), from the Loeb Classical Library, Cambridge, MA, Harvard University Press, 1940.  Online version at the Topos Text Project.
 Nonnus of Panopolis, Dionysiaca. 3 Vols. W.H.D. Rouse. Cambridge, MA., Harvard University Press; London, William Heinemann, Ltd. 1940–1942. Greek text available at the Perseus Digital Library.
 Pausanias, Description of Greece with an English Translation by W.H.S. Jones, Litt.D., and H.A. Ormerod, M.A., in 4 Volumes. Cambridge, MA, Harvard University Press; London, William Heinemann Ltd. 1918. . Online version at the Perseus Digital Library
 Pausanias, Graeciae Descriptio. 3 vols. Leipzig, Teubner. 1903.  Greek text available at the Perseus Digital Library.
 Pindar, Odes translated by Diane Arnson Svarlien. 1990. Online version at the Perseus Digital Library.
 Pindar, The Odes of Pindar including the Principal Fragments with an Introduction and an English Translation by Sir John Sandys, Litt.D., FBA. Cambridge, MA., Harvard University Press; London, William Heinemann Ltd. 1937. Greek text available at the Perseus Digital Library.

Kings of Phocis
Kings in Greek mythology
Phocian characters in Greek mythology